Solar power in Belgium reached an installed capacity of 4,254 MW of power generating 3,563 GWh of electricity in 2018. In 2015 PV solar power accounted for around 4% of Belgium's total electricity demand, the 4th highest penetration figure in the world, although the country is some way behind the leaders Germany, Italy and Greece at between 7% and 8% of electricity demand.

Installed capacity grew at an outstanding pace from 2008 until 2012, but its growth has since slowed to a steady pace. Almost all of solar power in Belgium is grid connected.

Timeline 

2007

Installed capacity of solar power increased drastically after 2007. During 2009 the amount of solar installations quadrupled from 16,000 to 65,000. Residential and small installations had a combined power of about 220 MWp.

2009

In December 2009, there were 35,500 solar power installations in the Flemish region, 17,000 in Wallonia and 7,000 in the Brussels Capital Region. The number of installations in the Flemish region in particular was expanding rapidly at that time due to a favourable support measure expiring at the end of the year.

2011

At the end of 2011 the bulk of photovoltaic capacity was installed in the Flemish Region (88%), the remaining 12% was found mostly in Wallonia. The smaller Brussels-Capital Region had an installed capacity of 7 MWp. .

2013

In 2013, Belgium's watt per capita distribution, the total installed photovoltaic capacity per inhabitant, amounted to 267 watts. This was the third highest per-capita figure in the European Union—and therefore also in the world at that time—just behind Germany (447 watts) and Italy (295 watts). In terms of the overall installed capacity of 2,983 MW, Belgium ranked tenth and belonged to the Top 10 leading photovoltaic countries in the world.

2014

In the afternoon of 20 March 2014, a new record of peak electricity generation had been achieved. According to the power supplier Eneco Energie, more than two gigawatt of electric power, corresponding to two full-sized nuclear power plants, were generated by solar PV and supplied more than 20 percent of the overall electricity consumption at the time.

2015

In 2015 Solar PV per capita amounted to 287 Watts, the third highest in the world after Germany and Italy, providing around 4% of Belgium's total electricity demand.

2016

Solar PV per capita grew to 302.8 Watts, remaining the third highest in the EU.

2022

OVAM, the public waste agency of the Flemish-speaking macro-region of Flanders, has created an online map of the region's 2,500 landfills. They cover a total surface area of ​​more than 100 square kilometers.

The agency said most of the sites are currently inactive. Only 2% of the region's waste is being brought to such locations.

Solar PV market by segment 

Nearly 63% of solar power installed in Belgium in 2017 was for small systems of less than 10 kW, mostly residential rooftop Solar PV. Larger systems over 250 kW accounted for almost 20% of the total.

Residential Solar PV Capacity 
According to a report on behalf of the European Commission in 2015 Belgium Flanders had an estimated 1,301 MW (666 MW) of residential solar PV capacity with 336,000 (232,000) residential solar PV prosumers in the country representing 7.1% (3.7%) of households. The average size of residential solar PV systems is estimated to be 3.87 kW moving to 2030. The technical potential for residential solar PV in Belgium Flanders is estimated at 7,327 MW and Belgium Wallonia at 3,753 MW . The payback time for residential Solar PV in Belgium Flanders was 14.7 years whilst in Belgium Wallonia it was 6.9 years as of 2015. Some of the advantages of small scale residential Solar include eliminating the need for extra land, keeping cost saving advantages in local communities and empowering households to become prosumers of renewable electricity and thus raising awareness of wasteful consumption habits and environmental issues through direct experience.

Flanders 
As of July 2012 there are 42,644 photovoltaic installations in the Flemish region that receive green certificates.

Subsidies 
Towards 2011, it became clear that Flemish subsidies for solar panels had a significant impact on the cost of electricity of households without a photovoltaic installation. An added cost of up to 148 EUR is charged annually. Flemish minister for Energy Freya van den Bossche admitted that subsidies were too high, especially for large-scale installations. The guaranteed minimum price for electricity produced was reduced. For small photovoltaic installations(less than 1 MW) it was reduced from 330 EUR per MWh to 250 EUR per MWh by January 2012 with the goal of reaching renewable energy targets at a reasonable cost. This resulted in a rally which caused the number of installations to almost double from 20,514 to 37,355 in 2011. The minimum price will be lowered further to 93 EUR per MWh from 2013 onwards.

Notable installations 
A solar park of 100MW is set to be built near the town of Lommel, in the Flemish province of Limburg. Construction will start in September 2018 and will be completed mid-2019. It will produce 83 GWh per year equivalent of the consumption of 24000 households.

In December 2009, Katoen Natie announced that they will install 800,000 m² of solar panels in various places, including Antwerp. It is expected that the installed solar power in the Flemish Region will be increased by 25%, when finished. That will be the largest installation in Europe. The installation produces about 35 GWh yearly. The total cost will be 166 million euros.

In October 2009, the city of Antwerp announced that they want to install 2,500 m² of solar panels on roofs of public buildings, that will generate 265 MWh per annum.

In 2009, the city of Leuven installed 1,810 solar panels on public buildings.

Wallonia

See also 

 Energy in Belgium
 Wind power in Belgium
 Solar power
 Renewable energy by country

References

External links

Belgium
Renewable energy in Belgium
Belgium